Daza or (in Hausa) Dazawa is listed by Blench (2006) as a Chadic language  within the Bole group,
spoken in a few villages of Darazo LGA, Bauchi State, Nigeria. It was confirmed to exist in 2021.

Notes

West Chadic languages
Languages of Nigeria